Bethesda Athletic F.C. is a football club based in the Welsh town of Bethesda, in northwest Wales who play in the North Wales Coast West Football League Premier Division.

History

Predecessor clubs
In 1919, a team known as Bethesda Comrades were playing in the North Wales Coast League. This name changed to Bethesda United. In the 1930s Bethesda Victoria were involved in North Wales football circles, winning the North Wales Combination and NWCFA Cup in 1930–31.

Early years and Welsh League (North)
Bethesda Athletic was formed in 1946. In the 1948–49 season they joined the Welsh National League (North) Division 1, and early years in the league saw them regularly finish bottom, or near bottom of the table.  The late 1960s saw the club regularly finish near the top of the division, with the first league title coming in the 1970–71 season, and a period of relative success followed in this period.

Athletic also enjoyed some good runs in the Welsh Cup, the English F.A. Cup, and the English F.A. Trophy.  A long Welsh Cup run in 1960 saw wins over Nantlle Vale, Penmaenmawr and Pwllheli which set up a Quarter Final date with Cardiff City which ended in a six nil defeat against the eventual winners. In 1976 they beat Oswestry Town but were knocked out by Bangor City at Farrar Road. The score was 4–2 goals from Broadhead, Olney and John Hughes for Bangor and Alan Leicester for Bethesda.

In the FA Cup Bethesda took Tamworth to two replays in 1970 before finally bowing out. In 1974 Bethesda knocked out South Liverpool in the Qualifying rounds of The FA Cup but were eventually beaten by Rhyl in a second replay after two drawn matches.

The club spent 28 seasons in the Welsh League (North) with their final season, 1976–77, bringing the club's second divisional Championship.

Caernarfon & District League and Gywnedd League
The 1977–78 season saw the club move to the Caernarfon & District League, where they remained for six seasons, before moving to the Gwynedd League for a singular season, where they finished in third position.

Welsh Alliance
1984–85 saw the club join the Welsh Alliance League, the successor to the Welsh League (North) as a founder member. For the first two seasons, the club were runners-up in the league, before in 1988–87 finishing as champions. In 1990 when fellow Welsh Alliance members Fflint, Conwy, Porthmadog and Connah's Quay joined the newly formed Cymru Alliance, Bethesda remained in the Welsh Alliance League.

Return to Caernarfon & District/ Gywnedd Leagues
After finishing third in the Welsh Alliance in 1990–91, the club decided to drop down to the local Caernarfon & District League where they remained until stepping up to the Gwynedd League after being crowned champions in 1997–98 season. After two seasons in this league they were promoted to the Welsh Alliance League in 2000 after being crowned champions for the 1999–2000 season.

Welsh Alliance success
The club spent nine years in the Welsh Alliance culminating in two successive championship winning years. In the 2007–08 season they were champions of the Welsh Alliance League but were refused promotion to the Cymru Alliance by the Football Association of Wales.  Two players, Gareth Davies and Richie Owen, scored 70 goals between them over the course of the season.

The following season saw the club break the league's season goal-scoring record, with 146 goals - again securing the league title.

After also completing upgrades to their football ground, the club stepped up to the second tier of Welsh football – the Cymru Alliance.

Cymru Alliance
The club spent a solitary season in the Cymru Alliance, finishing 9th from 17 clubs in 2009–10 season.

Return to the Welsh Alliance
The club returned to the Alliance, competing for two subsequent seasons.  In August 2012 they were not able to complete fixtures and were given 14 days by the league's Management Committee to resolve their issues. The club announced in September that it was disbanding and resigned from the league "due to various circumstances".

After a season away - the club returned for the 2013–14 season but finished bottom of the Welsh Alliance Division 2 with just 6 points. The following season saw them finish 10th from 16 clubs, before they again left the league.

Return to the Gwynedd League
The club returned to the Gwynedd League, finishing bottom of the league in the 2016–17 season.  The following season they withdrew from the league. 

In 2018 it was announced that the club would return to the league again but they again resigned from the league in August 2018 without playing any games.

They were named as a returning club for the 2019–20 season to same league.

Ladies
The club also has a ladies team, Bethesda Athletic Ladies, who were established in 2018. The play in the North Wales Women's Football League part of Wales' women's football pyramid. Their first season saw them compete in the second division, finishing the season as champions.  In their second season, they played in the first division before withdrawing from the league in September 2019 and having their results expunged.  The club announced they will continue to play instead at recreational level in the North Wales Recreational League.

Honours

 North Wales Coast West Football League Division One Cup – Winners: 2021–22 
 Caernarfon & District League – Champions (1): 1997–98
 Caernarfon & District League – Runners-Up (1): 1996–97
 Gwynedd League – Champions (1): 1999–2000
 Welsh Alliance – Champions (3): 1986–87; 2007–08, 2008–09
 Welsh Alliance – Runners-Up (3): 1984–85, 1985–86, 1987–88
 Welsh League (North) (2) – Champions: 1970–71, 1976–77
 Welsh League (North) (2) – Runners-Up: 1971–72, 1973–74
North Wales Coast FA Junior Challenge Cup – Winners: 1979–80

League history

Notes

References

External links
Bethesda Ladies official twitter
Bethesda official twitter
Official Facebook

Football clubs in Wales
Association football clubs established in 1946
1946 establishments in Wales
Sport in Gwynedd
Bethesda, Gwynedd
Cymru Alliance clubs
Gwynedd League clubs
Welsh Alliance League clubs
North Wales Coast Football League clubs
Welsh League North clubs